Ngaju (also Ngaju Dayak or Dayak Ngaju) is an Austronesian language spoken along the Kapuas, Kahayan, Katingan, and Mentaya Rivers in Central Kalimantan, Indonesia.  It is closely related to the Bakumpai language. There are three dialects—Pulopetak, Ba'amang, and Mantangai.

Phonology

Consonants 
Ngaju has the following consonants.

Vowels 
Ngaju has the following vowels.  All vowels except  can be long.

Orthography

Vowels and diphthongs 
 a – 
 e – 
 i – 
 o – 
 u – 
 ai – 
 au – 
 ei –

Consonants 
 b – 
 c – 
 d – 
 g – 
 h – 
 j – 
 k – 
 l – 
 m – 
 n – 
 ng – 
 ny – 
 p – 
 r – 
 s – 
 t – 
 w – 
 y –

Vocabulary  

Vocabulary comparison between Bakumpai, Ngaju, Indonesian and English languages.

Notes

References 

 
 

West Barito languages
Languages of Indonesia